The 2013 OFC Beach Soccer Championship took place from 31 August to 2 September 2013 on the grounds of the University of New Caledonia in Nouméa, New Caledonia. It acted as a qualifier for the 2013 FIFA Beach Soccer World Cup. This time around, a second OFC team qualified alongside Tahiti for the World Cup, due to the facts that Tahiti is the host of the World Cup and that the OFC is only supposed to have one representative.

The tournament was originally scheduled to take place in Papeete, Tahiti from August 4 – 9 however due to the Tahitian national squad being involved in a European tour it was decided that the competition would be moved to New Caledonia.

Participating teams
Three teams have been confirmed to be participating in the tournament

Group stage 
Due to numerous delays in the tournament's administration, the official schedule was not released until 22 August 2013, when the draw was conducted. The first-place finisher was declared the winner of the tournament.

All kickoff times are listed as local time in New Caledonia, (UTC+11:00).

Winners

Awards

Teams qualifying

Top scorers

Final standings

References

External links
2013 OFC Beach Soccer Championship

Beach Soccer Championship
Beach Soccer Championship
Qualification Ofc
International association football competitions hosted by French Polynesia
2013
2013 in beach soccer